Stade Georges-Chaumet (former name: Stade de Baduel) is a multi-use stadium in Cayenne, French Guiana.  It is currently used mostly for football of the French Guiana national football team matches.

The stadium has a capacity of 7,000 places; it has natural turf and a synthetic 400m track. The central area of the stadium, named "la caquette",  was renovated in 2012.

The stadium is also used for cultural events such as le Kayenn jazz festival.

In 2014, the stadium was renamed to Stade Georges-Chaumet.

References

External links

Football venues in French Guiana
Athletics (track and field) venues in French Guiana
Buildings and structures in Cayenne